Ragnar Jónasson (born 1976) is an Icelandic author of crime fiction. He is the author of the bestselling Dark Iceland series, set in and around Siglufjörður, and featuring Detective Ari Thor.

Novels

Dark Iceland series 
Snowblind (2010; translation of Snjóblinda, 2010)
Blackout  (2011; translation of Myrknætti, 2011)
Rupture  (2012; translation of Rof, 2012)
Whiteout  (2013; translation of Andköf, 2013)
Nightblind  (2014; translation of Náttblinda, 2014)
Winterkill  (2020; translation of Vetrarmein, 2020)
Note: The series order of the original Icelandic publications differs from that of the English translations.

Hidden Iceland series 
The Darkness (2018; translation of Dimma, 2015)
The Island (2019; translation of Drungi, 2016)
The Mist (2020; translation of Mistur, 2017)

Standalone novels 
The Girl Who Died (2021; translation of Þorpið, 2018)
Outside (2022; translation of Úti, 2021)
White Death (2023; translation of Hvítidauði, 2019)

References

External links
 

Living people
Ragnar Jónasson
1976 births